The Hirth HM 501 was a 6-cylinder air-cooled inverted in-line engine that was developed by Hirth Motoren GmbH in the late 1930s, from the 4-cylinder HM 500 and used principally on the submarine-born Arado Ar 231.

Applications
Arado Ar 231

Specifications (HM 501A)

References

Further reading

 

Hirth aircraft engines
Air-cooled aircraft piston engines
1930s aircraft piston engines
Inverted aircraft piston engines
Straight-six engines